Ius utendi (or usus), a term in civil law and Roman law, is an attribute of ownership (dominium): the right or power to use the property—particularly by residing there—without destroying its substance. It is employed in contradistinction to the ius abutendi, the right of disposal.

See also 
 Ius
 Ius abutendi

References
Black's Law Dictionary (Second Edition 1910) (public domain)

Latin legal terminology